Didier Lefèvre (1957–2007) was a French photojournalist. He was best known for co-authoring the book The Photographer, which told the story of his travels with a Médecins Sans Frontières mission during the Soviet–Afghan War.

Lefèvre shot more than 4,000 photos on his 1986 MSF mission. He suffered from chronic furunculosis; he lost fourteen teeth after the MSF mission as a consequence of malnutrition, exhaustion, and stress from his experiences. Nonetheless, Lefèvre returned to Afghanistan seven more times later in life.

Lefèvre was trained as a pharmacist. He died from heart failure on 29 January 2007 at the age of 49.

Awards 
 2004: Prix des libraires de bande dessinée for The Photographer (with Lemercier and Guibert )
 2007: Angoulême International Comics Festival Essentials for The Photographer (with Guibert et Lemercier)
 2007: Globes de Cristal Award for Best Comic Book for The Photographer (with Guibert et Lemercier)
 2010: Eisner Award for The Photographer (with Guibert)

References 

1957 births
2007 deaths
French photographers
Photography in Afghanistan